Midland High School is a rural high school in Midland, an unincorporated area in Acadia Parish, Louisiana, United States. It is administered by the Acadia Parish School Board.

In 2005 it had 330 students, and 20 teachers. 4% of the students were African American, and the remainder white.

School uniforms
Beginning in the 1999–2000 school year the school district required all students to wear school uniforms.

Athletics
Midland High athletics competes in the LHSAA.

See also 
 List of high schools in Louisiana

References

External links
 Midland High School
 publicschoolreview.com

Schools in Acadia Parish, Louisiana
Public high schools in Louisiana